Grant Green (1935–1979) was a jazz guitarist.

Grant Green may also refer to:

 Grant Green (baseball) (born 1987), baseball player
 Grant Green (Oklahoma politician)
 Grant Green, Jr. (born 1955), jazz guitarist
 Grant S. Green, Jr. (born 1938), U.S. Under Secretary of State